Ariel "Arik" Benado (born 5 December 1973) is an Israeli football manager and former player who played as a  centre-back.

Playing career

Benado was a second generation player at Maccabi Haifa; his father, Shlomo, appeared for Haifa in the 1970s. Arik began playing at the age of nine, rising through the ranks to the senior team. He spent a two-year spell with Beitar Jerusalem in the mid-1990s to gain experience. He has won five league championships and a State Cup title with Maccabi. Benado is also a long-standing member of the Israeli national team where he holds the record as the most capped player (94 caps), and plays as a central defender. He is a tough defender, his strength lies in his tackling due to quick foot work. He had successfully defended against top strikers with the club and the national team in Europe. He has also appeared for Maccabi in the UEFA Champions League group stage. Beitar signed him for his second term in the club for the 2006–07 season.

In June 2010, Benado agreed to return to Maccabi Haifa for one last season before his retirement in June 2011. He started on the bench but quickly became Elisha Levi's first choice in Maccabi Haifa's defense, helping Maccabi Haifa to win the championship.

Coaching career
On 17 November 2012, Benado was appointed as caretaker manager for Maccabi Haifa, before being appointed as the full manager a week later on 25 November 2012.

On 25 February 2014, Benado was appointed as the assistant manager for Eli Guttman in the Israeli national football team.

On 4 May 2015, Benado was appointed as the manager for the Israel national under-21 football team.

Managerial statistics

Honours

Player
 Israeli Premier League: 1993–94, 2000–01, 2001–02, 2003–04, 2004–05, 2005–06, 2006–07, 2007–08, 2010–11; runner-up 1999–00, 2002–03
 State Cup: 1993, 1998, 2008, 2009; runner-up 2002, 2011
 Toto Cup: 1993–94, 2001–02, 2005–06, 2009–10

Manager
 Israeli Premier League: runner-up 2012-13

Individual
Israeli Premier League Best Defender of the Year: 2007–08

See also
List of select Jewish football (association; soccer) players

References

External links

1973 births
Living people
Israeli Jews
Israeli footballers
Maccabi Haifa F.C. players
Beitar Jerusalem F.C. players
Israel international footballers
Footballers from Haifa
Liga Leumit players
Israeli Premier League players
Israeli people of Turkish-Jewish descent
Association football defenders
Maccabi Haifa F.C. managers
Bnei Yehuda Tel Aviv F.C. managers
Hapoel Ramat Gan F.C. managers
Israeli Premier League managers
Israeli football managers